Melanoplus ponderosus, the ponderous spur-throat grasshopper, is a species of spur-throated grasshopper in the family Acrididae. It is found in North America.

Subspecies
These two subspecies belong to the species Melanoplus ponderosus:
 Melanoplus ponderosus ponderosus (Scudder, 1875) i
 Melanoplus ponderosus viola Thomas, 1876 i
Data sources: i = ITIS, c = Catalogue of Life, g = GBIF, b = Bugguide.net

References

External links

 

Melanoplinae
Articles created by Qbugbot
Insects described in 1875